The 2019–20 Atlantic Coast Conference women's basketball season began with practices in October 2018, followed by the start of the 2019–20 NCAA Division I women's basketball season in November. Conference play started in January 2020 and will conclude in March with the 2020 ACC women's basketball tournament at the Greensboro Coliseum in Greensboro, NC.

The postseason was cut short due to the COVID-19 outbreak.  On March 12, the NCAA announced the tournament would be cancelled, along with all remaining winter and spring championships.  The  NCAA tournament and WNIT were both cancelled before they began.

Head coaches

Coaching changes

Georgia Tech fired MaChelle Joseph amid controversy after the 18–19 season.  In April, Nell Fortner was announced as the new head coach.
Sylvia Hatchell stepped down after 33 years as North Carolina's head coach after an investigation determined she had made “racially insensitive” comments and pressured injured players to compete.  Courtney Banghart was announced as the new head coach on April 30.

Coaches 

Notes:
 Year at school includes 2019–20 season.
 Overall and ACC records are from time at current school and are through the end the 2018–19 season.
 NCAA Tournament appearances are from time at current school only.
 NCAA Final Fours and Championship include time at other schools

Preseason

Preseason watch lists 
Below is a table of notable preseason watch lists.

ACC Women's Basketball Tip-off 
Prior to the start of the season, the ACC hosted a media day at the Westin Hotel in Charlotte, North Carolina.  At the media day, the head coaches voted on the finishing order of the teams, an All-ACC team, a Preseason Player of the Year, and Newcomers to watch.  The media day was hosted on October 3, 2019.  A selected group of student athletes also took questions from the media on this day.

At the media day, both the head coaches and the Blue Ribbon Panel predicted that Louisville would be league champion.

ACC preseason polls

Preseason All-ACC Teams

Preseason ACC Player of the Year

Newcomer Watchlist

Regular season

Rankings

Note: The Coaches Poll releases a final poll after the NCAA tournament, but the AP Poll does not release a poll at this time.  Due to the cancellation of the NCAA and WNIT tournaments, the Coaches Poll did not release a final poll.

Conference matrix
This table summarizes the head-to-head results between teams in conference play. Each team played 18 conference games, and at least 1 against each opponent. This marked the first year that teams played an eighteen-game conference schedule.

Player of the week
Throughout the conference regular season, the Atlantic Coast Conference offices named a Player(s) of the week and a Rookie(s) of the week.

Postseason

ACC tournament

NCAA tournament

National Invitation tournament

Honors and awards

ACC Awards

WNBA Draft 

The ACC lead all conferences with eight players selected in the 2020 WNBA Draft.  This is the second year in a row that the ACC has had the most selections of any conference.  The ACC has had at least one first round selection in the past fifteen WNBA Drafts.  The next longest such streak is six.

References